Stephen Joshua Solarz (September 12, 1940 – November 29, 2010) was an American politician who served as a United States representative from New York until his political career ended in the wake of the House banking scandal in 1992.

Solarz was active in international relations issues. In Congress, he was both an outspoken critic of President Ronald Reagan's deployment of Marines to Lebanon in 1982 and a cosponsor of the 1991 Gulf War Authorization Act during the Presidency of George H. W. Bush.

Early life and education

Born in Manhattan, New York City, Solarz attended public schools in New York City. He graduated from Midwood High School in 1958, and later received a B.A. from Brandeis University in 1962 and an M.A. in public law and government from Columbia University in 1967. Solarz taught political science at Brooklyn College during the 1967–1968 academic year.

New York Assembly 

In 1966, Solarz was the campaign manager for an anti-war campaign, for a U.S. House seat. He used that experience to make a successful run for the State Assembly two years later. He was a member of the New York State Assembly from 1969 to 1974, sitting in the 178th, 179th and 180th New York State Legislatures.

In the 1973 Democratic primary, Solarz ran against Sebastian Leone for Brooklyn borough president, and lost. That was not unexpected; Solarz had run mostly for improved name recognition and to make political and fund-raising contacts. In 1974, he was a delegate to the Democratic National Mid-term Convention.

Career in Congress

Election and re-elections 

In September 1974, Solarz defeated incumbent Democrat Bertram L. Podell in the Democratic primary for the New York 13th District.  At the time, Podell was under federal indictment; he was later convicted. In November 1974, Solarz was elected to the U.S. House of Representatives, to the 94th Congress, beginning January 3, 1975.  He was re-elected eight more times, serving until January 3, 1993.

Involvement in foreign policy 
On July 18, 1980, Solarz became the first American public official to visit North Korea since the end of the Korean War, and the first to meet with Kim Il-sung. In the 1980s, he chaired the Asian and Pacific Affairs Subcommittee of the House Foreign Affairs Committee, an area of growing interest to the American people in that decade. He is remembered for his leadership on the Philippines. He left Manila just as Benigno S. Aquino Jr. was coming home to challenge President Ferdinand E. Marcos. Following Aquino's assassination, Solarz returned to Manila for the funeral and proceeded to push the Reagan administration to distance itself from the Marcos government. Shortly after Marcos left for exile in Hawaii, Solarz visited one of his opulent palaces and publicized Imelda Marcos's massive shoe collection. He worked closely with Aquino's widow, Corazon, who became president, and who dubbed him the "Lafayette of the Philippines."

Solarz had strong ties to India and was held in high esteem by Indian leaders across the political spectrum. His motivations were partly driven by the presence of prosperous Indian Americans in his district. He visited India dozens of times, during and after his term in Congress, and once received a standing ovation on the floor of the Indian Parliament, as has happened to only a few Westerners, such as Presidents Bill Clinton and John F. Kennedy. He received bipartisan credit for having helped set the stage for substantial improvements in U.S.-India relations since the 1990s.

In 1982 and 1986, Solarz met with Iraqi President Saddam Hussein. In 1998, he led a group of neoconservatives urging President Bill Clinton to overthrow him.

Loss in primary, 1992 
The round of redistricting following the 1990 Census divided his district into six pieces, reflecting his cold relations with many state lawmakers in Albany. After conducting extensive polling, Solarz decided that rather than challenge Democratic incumbent Ted Weiss or Republican incumbent S. William Green, he would seek election to the open seat in the heavily Hispanic 12th Congressional District. Solarz entered the race damaged by the House banking scandal, having written 743 overdrafts; he was not charged, but his wife pled guilty to two criminal charges of writing bad checks on their joint account. Solarz was defeated in the Democratic primary by Nydia Velazquez. Neither Weiss nor Green were re-elected, as Weiss died before the election and was replaced on the ballot by Jerrold Nadler, while Green was defeated by Democrat Carolyn Maloney.

Post-Congressional career 
In 1993, Solarz was appointed as chairman of the U.S. government-funded Central Asian-American Enterprise Fund by President Bill Clinton to bring private sector development to Central Asia. He remained in this role until 1998.

In 1994, Solarz was a leading candidate to be nominated as the United States Ambassador to India. However, Solarz was forced to withdraw from consideration after scrutiny of his efforts to obtain a visa for a Hong Kong businessman with a criminal record. Solarz's poor relations with members of the United States Foreign Service and the New York state political establishment were also identified as reasons for the failure of his nomination. The post instead went to Frank G. Wisner.

From 1994 until his death, Solarz remained active with the National Democratic Institute for International Affairs. He was also a member of the Intellibridge Expert Network and of the executive committee of the International Crisis Group. Along with Zbigniew Brzezinski, Solarz served as co-chairman of the American Committee for Peace in the Caucasus.

Solarz served on the board of directors of the National Endowment for Democracy from 1992 to 2001, and was awarded its Democracy Service Medal on retirement. He was also a founding member of the board of directors of the Hollings Center for International Dialogue, helping to establish the organization's presence in Turkey, and served until his death in 2010.

Awards
 Democracy Service Medal (2001), National Endowment for Democracy

Death 
Solarz died of esophageal cancer on November 29, 2010, in Washington, D.C. at the age of 70. He was buried at the Congressional Cemetery in Washington, D.C.

See also
 List of Jewish members of the United States Congress

References

External links
 
 Immigration Votes: NumbersUSA
 For Solarz, a Career Ends in Grief and Relief
 "When To Go In", magazine article by Solarz
 Biography From International Crisis Group
 "Arms for Morocco?", magazine article by Solarz
 

1940 births
2010 deaths
Democratic Party members of the New York State Assembly
Jewish members of the United States House of Representatives
Brooklyn College faculty
Deaths from cancer in Washington, D.C.
People from McLean, Virginia
People from Manhattan
Brandeis University alumni
Columbia University alumni
Deaths from esophageal cancer
Burials at the Congressional Cemetery
Democratic Party members of the United States House of Representatives from New York (state)
Midwood High School alumni
20th-century American politicians